

List of Ambassadors

Eldad Golan Rosenberg 2021-
Shimon Agur 1990 - 1995
Shlomo Cohen 1986 - 1990
Eliezer Armon (Non-Resident, Guatemala City) 1977 - 1981
Jeonathan Prato  (Non-Resident, San Jose) 1971 - 1972
Joshua Nissim Shai (Non-Resident, Guatemala City) 1959 - 1964
Minister David Shaltiel (Non-Resident, Mexico City) 1956 - 1959
Minister Yossef Keisari (Non-Resident, Mexico City) 1954 - 1956

References

Honduras
Israel